Dominic Hannigan (born 10 July 1965) is a former Irish Labour Party politician who served as a Teachta Dála (TD) for the Meath East constituency from 2011 to 2016. He was a Senator for the Labour Panel from 2007 to 2011.

Early life
Hannigan was born in Drogheda, County Louth. He was educated at University College Dublin with a degree in Civil Engineering, at City University London with a Masters in Transport and at the University of London with a Masters in Finance.
He emigrated from Ireland in the 1980s to look for work. Hannigan returned to Ireland and worked as a Civil engineer.

Political career

Early years: 2004–2007
Hannigan entered electoral politics when he was elected as an independent councillor to Meath County Council for the Slane electoral area at the 2004 local elections, serving as chairperson of the council's Planning and Economic Development Committee. Hannigan subsequently joined the Labour Party in October 2004, and first stood for Dáil Éireann at the 2005 Meath by-election, which saw the Labour vote increase by over 3,000 first preference votes since the 2002 general election. His next election was the 2007 general election, again missing out on the third seat, this time to Thomas Byrne.

Seanad Éireann: 2007–2011
As part of an election pact between Labour and Sinn Féin for the 2007 elections to Seanad Éireann, Hannigan was elected on the first count to the Industrial and Commercial Panel of the Seanad. In Seanad Éireann he was the Labour Party Whip and spokesperson on Commuter Issues, Environment and Local Government, Foreign Affairs and Defence.

He was one of the first members of the Oireachtas to support the candidacy of Eamon Gilmore, following the resignation of Pat Rabbitte as leader of the Labour Party on 23 August 2007. He subsequently became the chairman of Eamon Gilmore's leadership campaign to become leader.

In September 2007 he submitted proposals to the Department of Environment and Local Government for town councils for Ashbourne and the Meath coastal area, and called for the abolition of county managers.

Hannigan said in 2011 that population growth during the Celtic Tiger years was more dramatic in Meath than elsewhere in Ireland and that this was having a profound effect on the county's education system. He spoke in favour of a cost-benefit analysis of the proposed Slane bypass in February 2011.

Dáil Éireann: 2011–2016
At the 2011 general election Hannigan topped the poll in Meath East. In doing so Hannigan became one of the first two openly gay people to be elected to Dáil Éireann, a distinction he shares with Dublin North-West's John Lyons.

The Meath Chronicle compared Hannigan to Speedy Gonzales as he "flitted at high speed from one spot to the next" on the campaign trail. He was "followed by a large posse of journalists and camera crews" when party leader Eamon Gilmore joined him during the campaign.

Hannigan was elected Chairman of the Joint Committee on the Implementation of the Good Friday Agreement in June 2011.

He was elected Chairman of the Joint Committee on EU Affairs in January 2012, following which he stepped down as Chairman of the Good Friday Agreement Committee. In a television interview broadcast in April 2012, he confirmed that the 99.8% state-owned bank Allied Irish Banks had paid one-and-a-half billion Euro to unsecured bank bondholders for which neither the bank nor the Irish state had no legal liability.

He lost his seat at the 2016 general election. He unsuccessfully contested the 2020 Seanad election.

Hannigan is a director of the Lough Mask Distillery

Personal life
Hannigan is openly gay.

References

External links
Dominic Hannigan's page on Labour Party website

1965 births
Living people
Alumni of University College Dublin
Gay politicians
Labour Party (Ireland) TDs
Local councillors in County Meath
Members of the 23rd Seanad
Members of the 31st Dáil
People from Drogheda
Politicians from County Louth
Labour Party (Ireland) senators
LGBT legislators in Ireland
21st-century LGBT people